Barunga is a name associated with several areas in Australia:
 In the Northern Territory
 Barunga, Northern Territory, Aboriginal community southeast of Katherine
Barunga Statement, 1988 statement of Aboriginal political objectives
 In South Australia
 Barunga Gap, South Australia, locality in the Mid North of the state
 Barunga West Council, local government area
 Barunga Range, small mountain range
 Hundred of Barunga, cadastral unit for land tenure